Stupid! is a British television comedy sketch show aimed at children of primary and secondary school age, which was first broadcast on CBBC and subsequently BBC One.

Main characters
King Stupid (played in Series 1 by Marcus Brigstocke, and Series 2 by Phil Cornwell) is an immortal who is the instigator of all stupidity. King Stupid has files on every human and can make them behave stupidly using an advanced computer system. He resides inside his castle in the Etherworld, a pan-dimensional realm with Deed Monarchs who over different aspects of human behaviour.

Recurring characters include Jas (played by Stephanie Wookey), Jeff the Chef (Jimmy Akingbola), Scout Leader (Dominic Coleman), Dinner Lady (Miranda Hart), and the ice cream man (James Bachman).

Episodes

Series 1 (2004)

Series 2 (2006–07)

References

External links

 
 

BBC children's television shows
2004 British television series debuts
2007 British television series endings
British children's fantasy television series